Women’s Murder Club is a murder mystery franchise by the author James Patterson. It may refer to:

 Women's Murder Club (novel series)
 Women's Murder Club (TV series)